Matt Reis (born March 28, 1975) is an American former soccer player and coach who played as a  goalkeeper. A long-time Major League Soccer mainstay, he has served as goalkeeper coach for LA Galaxy and the United States.

Youth and college
Reid was born in Atlanta and raised in Southern California. He played college soccer at UCLA. He finished his college career with an NCAA Championship in 1997, and was named 1997 NCAA College Cup Defensive MVP after recording 20 saves - including a school-record 11 in the semifinals - and posting 221 shutout minutes on the way to the title.

Career

Professional
Reis was selected by the Los Angeles Galaxy in the third round of the 1998 MLS College Draft. However, with Kevin Hartman firmly entrenched in the nets, Reis did not see much playing time during his five seasons in LA; the most games he played in a season was 16 in 2001 when Hartman was out with injuries. In 2000, the Galaxy sent him on loan to the Orange County Waves for seven games.  

Reis was traded to New England Revolution in January 2003 in exchange for Alex Pineda Chacón and a second-round pick in the 2003 MLS SuperDraft.
With the Revs, Reis started out as a backup to Adin Brown, but won the starting job midway through the 2004 season. He became the first goalie in MLS history to stop two penalty kicks in one playoff game, doing as the Revs upset the much-favored Columbus Crew. He also saved two out of four penalties in the penalty kick shootout against the Fire in the first round of the 2006 Playoffs. Reis was a finalist for the MLS Goalkeeper of the Year Award in both 2005 and 2006. He won the SuperLiga in 2008 and the Lamar Hunt US Open Cup in 2007 with the Revs. Reis was also named the 2008 Midnight Riders Man of the Year.

Reis retired following the 2013 season, joining the Los Angeles Galaxy as goalkeeper coach.

International
Reis got his first cap for the United States on January 22, 2006, a 0-0 shutout against Canada.

Personal
Reis was considered to be a bit of a jokester among his teammates and in the soccer community. As an April Fools' Day prank in 2004, the Revs' front office announced their newest foreign acquisition, Luis "El Lobo" Fangoso, who eventually turned out to be Matt Reis wearing a shaggy wig and headband. Although the initial joke died down fairly quickly, Reis' antics helped him win over many Revolution fans (to this day, Revs fans occasionally make joking references to Fangoso when discussing possible player transactions). On April 1, 2007, the Revolution announced that they had resigned Fangoso to a 2-year deal.

Reis, who is bald, also convinced Mexican international José Manuel Abundis, who had just signed with the team, to shave his head for the 2006 MLS Playoffs. This has enabled Reis to achieve cult status among Revs fans who know him as the "Skin headed, short sleeved shot stopper".

Reis is married to Nicole Reis (née Odom), who was an All American Softball player at UCLA.  They have three boys. He is the son of J.T. and Kathy Reis of Mission Viejo, California, and he has one older brother, Mike.

On 15 April 2013, Reis was present at the Boston Marathon bombing where he saved the life of his father-in-law (John Odom), whose legs had been pierced by shrapnel, causing two severed arteries.

Honors

Individual
MLS Humanitarian of the Year: 2013

Team
United States
CONCACAF Gold Cup Champions (1): 2005

Los Angeles Galaxy
CONCACAF Champions Cup (1): 2000
MLS Cup (1): 2002
Supporters' Shield (2): 1998, 2002
U.S. Open Cup (1): 2001

New England Revolution
U.S. Open Cup (1): 2007
North American SuperLiga (1): 2008

References

External links

1975 births
American soccer players
Association football goalkeepers
CONCACAF Gold Cup-winning players
Living people
LA Galaxy players
New England Revolution players
Major League Soccer All-Stars
Orange County Blue Star players
UCLA Bruins men's soccer players
United States men's international soccer players
A-League (1995–2004) players
2005 CONCACAF Gold Cup players
Soccer players from Atlanta
Major League Soccer players
LA Galaxy draft picks
LA Galaxy non-playing staff
NCAA Division I Men's Soccer Tournament Most Outstanding Player winners